Dacryopinax is a genus of fungi in the family Dacrymycetaceae. The genus is widespread, especially in tropical regions, and contains about 15 species. Dacryopinax was circumscribed by American mycologist George Willard Martin in 1948. A taxonomic monograph was published by McNabb (1965). 

Dacryopinax species are common wood inhabiting fungi worldwide, mostly producing brown rot wood decay. Genomic analysis of Dacryopinax primogenitus revealed the loss of genes for class II peroxidases necessary for lignin degradation, supporting observations of a brown rot physiology.

Species
The genus consists of the following species:

 Dacryopinax aurantiaca
 Dacryopinax crenata
 Dacryopinax dennisii
 Dacryopinax elegans
 Dacryopinax felloi
 Dacryopinax fissus
 Dacryopinax foliacea
 Dacryopinax formosus
 Dacryopinax imazekiana
 Dacryopinax indacocheae
 Dacryopinax lowyi
 Dacryopinax macrospora
 Dacryopinax martinii
 Dacryopinax maxidorii
 Dacryopinax parmastoensis
 Dacryopinax petaliformis
 Dacryopinax primogenitus
 Dacryopinax spathularia
 Dacryopinax sphenocarpa
 Dacryopinax taibaishanensis
 Dacryopinax xizangensis
 Dacryopinax yungensis

References

Dacrymycetes